Christoffel Johannes van der Linde (born 27 August 1980) is a South African former professional rugby union player and currently the scrum coach at French Top 14 side . His usual playing position was prop.

Career

Youth

As he progressed through the youth ranks at the Cheetahs, he continued playing for national youth sides, representing the Under-19s in 1999 and the Under-21s in 2000 and 2001.

Free State Cheetahs

Van der Linde was involved in the senior setup at the Cheetahs from 2001, when he was named in their squad for the 2001 Currie Cup competition. He remained with the Free State Cheetahs until 2008, making 45 domestic appearances in the Vodacom Cup and Currie Cup competitions during his spell there.

Van der Linde also played in five Super Rugby seasons during his spell at the Cheetahs. Van der Linde played for them during both seasons, making 19 appearances.

Leinster

Van der Linde signed a three-year contract with Leinster in late 2008. He represented them in the Celtic League and Heineken Cup competitions between 2008 and 2010, but his spell at Leinster was blighted by a recurrent foot problem. He got an early release from his contract, leaving the side in 2010.

Van der Linde did play for Leinster in the 2010 Celtic League Grand Final, a match they lost 17–12 to the Ospreys.

Return to Free State Cheetahs

Van der Linde returned to his former side the  following his release from Leinster and made four appearances for them during the 2010 Currie Cup Premier Division competition.

Stormers

Van der Linde joined the Cape Town-based  for 2011, making 11 appearances for them during the 2011 Super Rugby season.

Lions

He made his Lions debut in the 2011 Currie Cup Premier Division semi-final match against  and also started the final, when the Lions beat the Sharks 42–16 to win the Currie Cup for the first time in 12 years. He left the Lions after his contract expired at the end of 2013.

London Irish

On 12 December 2013, it was announced that he had signed with London Irish until the end of the 2013–14 season in the Aviva Premiership. However, Van der Linde only made a single appearance for London Irish, playing 20 minutes.

Eastern Province Kings

The Eastern Province Rugby Union later confirmed that he got a contract for the until the end of 2014. He made ten appearances for the Eastern Province Kings and were named their scrum coach prior to the 2015 Currie Cup Premier Division.

Montpellier

Van der Linde joined  prior to the 2015–16 Top 14 season on a two-year contract. He made just four appearances for Montpellier before tearing a bicep, which resulted in his decision to retire from playing rugby. However, he stayed on at Montpellier, where he joined the coaching staff by becoming the scrum coach.

International rugby

Van der Linde made his debut for the Springboks as a 20-year-old on 16 November 2002 in a match against Scotland at Murrayfield, which South Africa lost 21–6. He earned another cap for South Africa that year, playing England at Twickenham.

Van der Linde next played for the Springboks in 2004, against Ireland in a two test series in South Africa, and also played against the Pacific Islands team in Gosford. He was subsequently named in the Springboks' 2004 Tri Nations Series squad, and played in three matches during the series. He earned another five caps for South Africa during the end-of-year Northern Hemisphere tests.

Van der Linde played 17 times for the Springboks in 2005 including mid-year matches against France and in the 2005 Tri Nations Series. After playing for the Springboks in the 2006 mid-year rugby tests he was named in the 2006 Tri Nations Series squad. On 26 November 2006, he scored his first try in international play against England at Twickenham.

Van der Linde was part of the South African team which won the 2007 Rugby World Cup.

References

External links
Van der Linde profile at Lions website 

1980 births
Living people
Afrikaner people
Alumni of Grey College, Bloemfontein
Cheetahs (rugby union) players
Expatriate rugby union players in Ireland
Free State Cheetahs players
Golden Lions players
Leinster Rugby players
Lions (United Rugby Championship) players
London Irish players
Montpellier Hérault Rugby players
Rugby union players from Welkom
Rugby union props
South Africa international rugby union players
South African expatriate rugby union players
South African expatriate sportspeople in Ireland
South African rugby union coaches
South African rugby union players
Stormers players